Sheffield Students' Union, officially known as the University of Sheffield Students' Union, is the representative body of students at the University of Sheffield. It is run by a team of thirteen elected officers (7 full-time officers and 6 part-time officers).

History

The forerunner of the university was Firth College (1879) which had both a Student Common Room and student societies including an Athletics Union.  The Common Room Committee specifically had a 'chairman/woman' indicating equal status (unusual for the time) with a woman student winning the earliest known election in 1896.  However, for the university itself, a Student Representative Council (SRC) was formed in 1906, with the name 'The University of Sheffield Union of Students' being first used in 1923.  The first SRC had 20 men and 10 women elected, with 4 men and 3 women as officers.  There was a Student President and two Vice-Presidents, one male and one female. For some periods it was called the Guild of Students.

The building for the new university, now called Firth Court, had two common rooms for students, one for men and one for women in which events could be organized.  There was initial reluctance to hold dances on university property, but eventually dances were held in the main hall at lunchtimes and evenings.  The university acquired two small buildings in 1928 to serve as student clubs, but the Union did not get a separate building till 1936, the Graves Building (funded by J. G. Graves and designed by the Professor of Architecture, Stephen Walsh). This building is still present within the complex, though the interior is much altered.

Because of the expansion in numbers, a new building was constructed in 1960–61 adjacent to the Graves Hall and linked to it, which is the basis of the current Union building.  A link block had what was claimed to be the longest Union bar in the country.  A further expansion of the building took place in 1978, and various refurbishments occurred thereafter until 1993–6 when there was extensive reconstruction and extension, to accommodate a further increase in numbers, creating a substantially new building, designed by Mott Architecture.

In addition to the Union building, the Union shared facilities with the university in adjacent buildings; University House and the Octagon Centre.  A major development project was completed in 2013, integrating University House into the Union building and providing an enclosed bridge to the Octagon Centre.

Aims and policies
The Students' Union aims to "advance the education of Students" by "representing the students of the University locally and nationally, organising services and activities to meet their needs" and "taking positive measures to encourage and build a student community which respects and celebrates the diversity of its membership".

The Students' Union, its officers and staff are bound by democratically chosen policies and are reviewed every three years (unless circumstances warrant a more frequent review).

Education policies
The Students' Union campaigns for the abolition of all tuition fees, introduction of financial support for postgraduate students, reinstatement of public investment in education as a social good, and against cuts to education.

Environmental and ethical policies
The Students' Union maintains an environmental policy, undertaking the Students' Union to: educate its members on the issue of climate change, implement an Environment Code of Best Practice, call on the university to reduce its environmental footprint, lobby local authorities to work towards a sustainable Sheffield.
Nestlé products are banned within the Students' Union and its commercial services and the Students' Union has no dealings with the company due to its "unfair exploitation of third world countries".
As the result of a referendum in 2012, the Students' Union has introduced a 'strong anti-arms trade policy', and has consistently lobbied the university since to divest itself of any involvement with the international arms trade.
In a referendum in 2011, students of Sheffield Students' Union approved a policy to stop selling bottled water and replace it with a series of free drinking fountains and affordable, re-usable bottles. The bottled water ban was upheld following a referendum in October 2014, and will remain in place until 2017. The Students' Union council gave its support to the Go Fossil Free campaign by passing a motion in spring 2014. This global divestment movement, initiated by 350.org, encourages investors to remove their financial support for companies involved in the extraction and combustion of fossil fuels; activities which must be stopped in order to limit anthropogenic global warming.

Representative policies
The Students' Union has  LGBT friendly policy, ensuring that all activities, facilities, services, organisations and events are LGBT friendly.

Policies pertaining to the Israeli–Palestinian conflict
The University of Sheffield Students' Union has two policies relating to the Israeli–Palestinian conflict, entitled "End Israeli Occupation" and "Twinning with the Islamic University of Gaza". The Students' Union, according to these policies, lobbies the university to "divest itself from ... companies that are complicit in the occupation of the Palestinian territories" and ensures that the university fosters links with the Islamic University of Gaza, offering a scholarship programme to one of their students on an annual basis. It further commits the Students' Union to "raise awareness of the global Boycott, Divestment and Sanctions (BDS) movement", although does not explicitly endorse it as was the case prior to March 2019.

On 16 January 2018, the Students' Union released a statement condemning the decision of US President Donald Trump to recognise Jerusalem as the capital of Israel. In the statement, on behalf of the Students' Union Council, President Kieran Maxwell condemned the move as resulting in "the human rights of Palestinians [being] undermined and violated" and called for "an end to the Israeli occupation of Palestinian territories, and for East Jerusalem to be recognised as the Capital of Palestine".

Representation
The Union is run by a variety of working, representative and standing committees, presided over by the Student Union Council (SUC), seven elected full-time officers and six part-time officers (prior to the 21/22 academic year there were eight full-time officer roles and no part-time officers). These elected officers are supported by a number permanent staff led by the Chief Executive Daryl Ormerod who took over the reins from Chris Aucott (who, in turn, succeeded Jaki Booth). Paul Blomfield, now MP for Sheffield Central constituency, was in the role for a number of years before stepping down in 2010. It is a constituent member of the NUS.

Facilities
The Union has a turnover of around £11,000,000. It provides for over 270 student societies, and contains a student employment service, two bars, four club venues, and outlets for food and drink, clothing and stationery.

'Bar One' is a traditional student bar, while 'The Interval' is described as a "laid back and sophisticated café bar". Both bars hold pre-club nights with music and special events, and serve food and drinks. 'Bar One' was previously the longest union bar in the country. The union contains one of the largest beer gardens in Sheffield.

Activities

Events
The Students' Union holds a variety of student club nights throughout the week at the main club venue, Foundry. These include pop music nights ROAR on Wednesday, Pop Tarts on Saturday. On Tuesdays, The Tuesday Club is a night focusing on underground dance music, usually Drum and Bass, UK Garage or House. Various other nights including LGBT+ night "Proud", Swing & Jazz night "Jam Jar" and international students' night "One" are held in the Foundry monthly on alternating weeks. Live music events and gigs are also regularly held in the Foundry, along with conference events and fairs.

Several times a year, larger, multi-venue events encompassing the entire Students' Union site, such as Halloween Freaks Festival in October and Summer Social in June, attracting over 4,000 students.

The Union, under its obligation as part of the NUS to provide 24-hour support for students, funds Sheffield University Nightline, a telephone and email based listening and information service run by student volunteers from the university.

Societies and clubs
The Union has a list of approximately 320 societies and clubs, all run through a section of the union named "The Activities and Sports Zone".

Film Unit, the Union's Film Committee, shows three films a week during term time on Fridays, Saturdays and Sundays. Films are played in a cinema with a capacity of nearly 400, equipped with commercial 35 mm film projectors and a Dolby Digital sound system. SUTCo (Sheffield University Theatre Company) produce six plays a year at the Drama Studio, a studio theatre converted from a church, as well as the biennial 24 Hour Charity Musical – rehearsed, choreographed, designed and produced within a 24-hour period. They also produce two alternative venue productions per year. The Technical Services Committee (TSC)  are volunteers responsible for the setting up and running of equipment at the aforementioned club nights and live events at the Union.

Charity
The union has an active volunteering and charity community. The RAG (Raising and Giving society) raised over £180,000 in 2011–12, through general fundraising and several larger events; the union is host to the world's largest student organised charity hitchhike, Bummit, which runs every year. Another RAG tradition is Spiderwalk, a 12.5-mile trek through the city and the Peak District through the night; other societies run fund-raising activities throughout the night, such as a 24-hour role-playing event. The Union's "SheffieldVolunteering" scheme is one of the country's most active and well-recognised student volunteering schemes, with over 26,269 hours logged in 2011–12, and has won various national acclaims over the years.

Publications and broadcasting
The union's publication and broadcasting is branded under the name of Forge Media.

The Forge Press newspaper (formerly The Steel Press) is published fortnightly, while Forge Radio is the union's own radio station which broadcasts throughout the Union building during term-time and over the internet. Forge TV – the newest part of Forge Media – is the Union's own television station, broadcasting online and around campus, as well as producing on-demand content.

As of September 2010, former Radio 1 DJ Mary Anne Hobbs joined the Forge Media team.

Sports
The union supports a large number of sports teams, which compete in the BUCS championships. The annual Varsity Challenge takes place between teams from the university and its rival Sheffield Hallam University in over 30 events.

Awards
It has won a succession of prestigious awards, including:

– Best Higher Education Students' Union in the country at the first ever NUS awards ceremony in 2008 

– Top UK Student Union: in the 2001 Virgin Alternative Guide to Universities

– #1 Students' Union in the UK every year since 2009 to the Times Higher Education reports.

References

 Union gets award for best student union in the UK

External links
 Official website

Sheffield
Sheffield
Union of Students
Student organizations established in 1906
Nightclubs in Sheffield
Buildings and structures in Sheffield
1906 establishments in England